Andreas Miltiadis (born 30 August 1996 in Palaichori Oreinis) is a Cypriot cyclist, who currently rides for UCI Continental team .

Major results

2015
 National Road Championships
1st  Time trial
1st  Under-23 time trial
2nd Under-23 road race
 2nd Cross-country, National Under-23 Mountain Bike Championships
2016
 National Road Championships
1st  Time trial
1st  Under-23 time trial
2nd Under-23 road race
 1st  Cross-country, National Under-23 Mountain Bike Championships
 7th Hets Hatsafon
2017
 Games of the Small States of Europe
1st  Time trial
2nd  Cross-country
 National Road Championships
1st  Time trial
3rd Road race
2018
 National Road Championships
1st  Time trial
2nd Road race
2019
 National Road Championships
1st  Road race
1st  Time trial
 4th Overall International Tour of Rhodes
2020
 National Road Championships
1st  Road race
1st  Time trial
2021
 National Road Championships
1st  Road race
1st  Time trial
 1st  Mountains classification International Tour of Rhodes
2022
 National Road Championships
1st  Road race
1st  Time trial
 4th Time trial, Mediterranean Games
 9th Overall International Tour of Hellas
 10th Time trial, Commonwealth Games

References

External links

1996 births
Living people
Cypriot male cyclists
People from Nicosia District
Cyclists at the 2015 European Games
European Games competitors for Cyprus
Cyclists at the 2018 Commonwealth Games
Commonwealth Games competitors for Cyprus
Cyclists at the 2019 European Games
Competitors at the 2018 Mediterranean Games
Mediterranean Games competitors for Cyprus
21st-century Cypriot people